is a Japanese politician (Democratic Party of Japan, Kano group) and member of the House of Representatives for Tokyo 2nd district.

Political career 
Nakayama graduated from the Sports Department of the Tokyo University of Education. After serving three terms in the municipal assembly of Taitō (1979–1991) and two terms in the prefectural assembly of Tokyo (1993–1999) for the LDP, the JRP, the NFP and finally the DPJ, he was elected to the House of Representatives in a 1999 by-election in Tokyo 2nd district. The seat had been vacated when Kunio Hatoyama (then DPJ) resigned for his unsuccessful campaign for governor of Tokyo. Nakayama was re-elected in the House of Representatives general elections of 2000 and 2003. In 2005, he lost his seat to Liberal Democrat Takashi Fukaya and also failed to win a proportional seat in the Tokyo block. In the landslide Democratic victory of 2009, he regained his district seat.

Nakayama has held several Democratic Party posts including vice-chairman of the Diet affairs committee, chairman of the "mobilization committee" (kokumin-undō-iinkai) and vice-president of the DPJ Tokyo prefectural federation. In the Hatoyama cabinet of 2009, he was special advisor to the prime minister for SME policy and "regional revitalization", during the 1st and 2nd reshuffled Kan cabinets of 2010 and 2011 parliamentary secretary of Economy, Trade and Industry. In the 2011 leadership election, he supported Michihiko Kano's bid for the DPJ presidency and subsequently joined Kano's newly formed faction (formally 素交会, Sokōkai) where he became secretary general. In January 2012, he succeeded Osamu Yoshida as chairman of the House of Representatives economy, trade and industry committee (keizai sangyō iinkai, lit. "economy and industry committee"). Later that year he followed Makiko Tanaka who was appointed to the cabinet as chair of the committee on foreign affairs.

2010 comments on women's entrepreneurship 
As parliamentary secretary in 2010, Nakyama had caused a controversy by remarks made during the APEC Women's Entrepreneurship Summit: His claim that "Japanese women find pleasure in working at home and that has been part of Japanese culture" and similar statements drew angry responses from participants, media and women's rights groups as they spread to the public. Women across Japan formed an online protest group that initiated an e-mail campaign to demand an apology. Nakayama later said he "regrets" his comments.

Family 
Nakyama's eldest son Hiroyuki (寛進) is a former member and vice-president of the Taitō assembly and candidate for mayor of Taitō in 2011, his second son Tomoyasu (智康) a former member of the Hokkaidō prefectural assembly.

External links 
 Official website 
 House of Representatives biography

References 

|-

Members of the House of Representatives (Japan)
Democratic Party of Japan politicians
New Frontier Party (Japan) politicians
20th-century Japanese politicians
Japan Renewal Party politicians
Liberal Democratic Party (Japan) politicians
1945 births
People from Taitō
Living people
21st-century Japanese politicians